"Ill Behaviour" is a song by British drum and bass DJ, producer, and musician Danny Byrd. It is the second single released from his third album, Rave Digger. The song was released on 26 September 2010 for digital download and on 27 September 2010 for 12". The song, whose lyrics are based on "One For The Trouble" by A.D.O.R., features the voice of singer-songwriter I-Kay from Bristol, who has worked on several Danny Byrd track releases. "III Behaviour" has been supported by MistaJam, Annie Mac, and Sara Cox on BBC Radio 1. The single was promoted to BBC Radio 1 A-list status on 8 September 2010. The single entered the UK Singles Chart at number 36, Byrd's first top-40 single.  It is featured as a soundtrack to the video game F1 2011.

Critical reception
Fraser McAlpine of BBC Chart Blog gave the song a positive review stating:

Track listings

Chart performance

For "Ill Behaviour"

For "Moonwalker"

Release history

References

2010 singles
Danny Byrd songs
Songs written by Danny Byrd
2010 songs
Hospital Records singles